The crime rate (crime incidence per 100,000 of population) in India has decreased from 487.8 in 2020 to 445.9 in 2021 according to the National Crime Records Bureau. Crime occurrence and crime rate varies from state to state and also by the type of crime. 

Among states, Kerala has the highest crime rate, and Nagaland has the lowest crime rate in 2021. Overall, Delhi has the highest crime rate, and D&N Haveli and Daman & Diu has the lowest crime rate in 2021.

Violent crimes are particularly high in Eastern India, Northeast India, National Capital Region (India). Bihar, Jharkhand, Odisha, West Bengal, Assam, Tripura, Arunachal Pradesh, Delhi, Haryana, Maharashtra, and Madhya Pradesh have violent crime rate higher than the national average in 2021.

Jharkhand has the highest murder rate in 2021.

Rajasthan has the highest rape rate in 2021.

Delhi has the highest kidnapping and robbery rate in 2021.

Punjab has the highest drugs trafficking rate in 2021.

Uttar Pradesh has the highest illegal arms seizure rate in 2021.

Some causes of crimes are region specific. Insurgents committed 178 crimes in 2021, mostly in Manipur. Left wing extremists committed 387 crimes in 2021, mostly in Chhattisgarh. Terrorists committed 380 crimes in 2021, mostly in Jammu & Kashmir.

Gujarat has the highest investigation and charge-sheeting rate, while Manipur has the lowest investigation and charge-sheeting rate in 2021.

Mizoram has the highest conviction rate, while Lakshadweep has the lowest conviction rate in 2021.

State-wise statistics 
Data is based on the annual "Crime in India" publication by the National Crime Records Bureau.

Key:

 Crime Rate is calculated as crime per one lakh (100,000) of population. That is, rate of cognizable crimes (IPC+SLL).
 IPC: Indian Penal Code
 SLL: Special & Local Laws
 Crime Density: Crime per 100 sq. km 
 Investigation rate: Cases disposed, quashed or withdrawn by police as a percentage of total cases available for investigation
 Charge-sheeting rate: Cases where charges were framed against accused, as a percentage of total cases disposed after investigation 
 Conviction rate: Cases where accused was convicted by court after completion of a trial, as a percentage of total cases where trial was completed

Crime rate (per 100,000 population) head-wise 2021. Crimes against children rate is calculated per 100,000 children population.

See also
 Crime in India
 Law enforcement in India

References

Crime rate
 
Crime rate
India, crime rate